The 1974 CFL season is considered to be the 21st season in modern-day Canadian football, although it is officially the 17th Canadian Football League season.

CFL News in 1974
The Eastern Conference extended its regular season schedule from 14 to 16 games in 1974. The Western Football Conference had been playing a 16-game schedule since 1952. ORFU, which had not competed for the Grey Cup in 20 seasons and had dropped to amateur status, ceased to exist. The Montreal Alouettes change their colours to red, white and blue, and adopt the triangular logo with the Montreal colours in it on a navy blue helmet.

The first players' strike in league history occurred during training camp. The strike was settled prior to the beginning of the regular season. No games were cancelled as a result of the dispute. It was this strike, which coincided with a similarly timed strike in the National Football League, which brought into existence the World Football League, a potential rival league to both the NFL and CFL, and one of the WFL's teams was to be placed in Toronto. In retaliation, Canadian Parliament introduced (but never passed) the Canadian Football Act, which would have given the CFL a government-enforced monopoly on professional football in Canada. The spectre of the bill prompted the Toronto franchise owner to relocate his team to the U.S. before it began play, and the only presence the WFL would ever have in Canada was a single game in London, Ontario, a city where the CFL had (and still has today) no direct presence.

Regular season standings

Final regular season standings
Note: GP = Games Played, W = Wins, L = Losses, T = Ties, PF = Points For, PA = Points Against, Pts = Points

Bold text means that they have clinched the playoffs.
Edmonton and Montreal have first round byes.

Grey Cup playoffs

The Montreal Alouettes are the 1974 Grey Cup champions, defeating the Edmonton Eskimos, 20–7, at Vancouver's Empire Stadium. Montreal's Sonny Wade (QB) was named the Grey Cup's Most Valuable Player on Offence and Junior Ah You (DE) was named the Grey Cup's Most Valuable Player on Defence. Montreal's Don Sweet (K) was named Grey Cup's Most Valuable Canadian.

Playoff bracket

CFL Leaders
 CFL Passing Leaders
 CFL Rushing Leaders
 CFL Receiving Leaders

1974 CFL All-Stars

Offence
QB – Tom Wilkinson, Edmonton Eskimos
RB – George Reed, Saskatchewan Roughriders
RB – Lou Harris, BC Lions
RB – Roy Bell, Edmonton Eskimos
TE – Tony Gabriel, Hamilton Tiger-Cats
WR – Johnny Rodgers, Montreal Alouettes
WR – Rhome Nixon, Ottawa Rough Riders
C – Bob Swift, Winnipeg Blue Bombers
OG – Ed George, Montreal Alouettes
OG – Curtis Wester, BC Lions
OT – Charlie Turner, Edmonton Eskimos
OT – Larry Watkins, Edmonton Eskimos

Defence
DT – John Helton, Calgary Stampeders
DT – Jim Stillwagon, Toronto Argonauts
DE – Wayne Smith, Ottawa Rough Riders
DE – George Wells, Saskatchewan Roughriders
LB – Jerry Campbell, Ottawa Rough Riders
LB – Mike Widger, Montreal Alouettes
LB – Roger Goree, Calgary Stampeders
DB – Al Marcelin, Ottawa Rough Riders
DB – Dick Adams, Ottawa Rough Riders
DB – Larry Highbaugh, Edmonton Eskimos
DB – Lorne Richardson, Saskatchewan Roughriders
DB – Dickie Harris, Montreal Alouettes

1974 Eastern All-Stars

Offence
QB – Jimmy Jones, Montreal Alouettes
RB – Andy Hopkins, Hamilton Tiger-Cats
RB – Art Green, Ottawa Rough Riders
RB – Steve Ferrughelli, Montreal Alouettes
TE – Tony Gabriel, Hamilton Tiger-Cats
WR – Johnny Rodgers, Montreal Alouettes
WR – Rhome Nixon, Ottawa Rough Riders
C – Bob McKeown, Ottawa Rough Riders
OG – Ed George, Montreal Alouettes
OG – Ed Chalupka, Hamilton Tiger-Cats
OT – Noah Jackson, Toronto Argonauts
OT – Dan Yochum, Montreal Alouettes

Defence
DT – Rudy Sims, Ottawa Rough Riders
DT – Jim Stillwagon, Toronto Argonauts
DE – Wayne Smith, Ottawa Rough Riders
DE – Junior Ah You, Montreal Alouettes
LB – Jerry Campbell, Ottawa Rough Riders
LB – Mike Widger, Montreal Alouettes
LB – Chuck Zapiec, Montreal Alouettes
DB – Al Marcelin, Ottawa Rough Riders
DB – Dick Adams, Ottawa Rough Riders
DB – Rod Woodward, Ottawa Rough Riders
DB – Al Brenner, Hamilton Tiger-Cats
DB – Dickie Harris, Montreal Alouettes
DB – Phil Price, Montreal Alouettes

1974 Western All-Stars

Offence
QB – Tom Wilkinson, Edmonton Eskimos
RB – George Reed, Saskatchewan Roughriders
RB – Lou Harris, BC Lions
RB – Roy Bell, Edmonton Eskimos
SB – Rudy Linterman, Calgary Stampeders
TE – Tyrone Walls, Edmonton Eskimos
WR – Tom Forzani, Calgary Stampeders
WR – Tom Scott, Winnipeg Blue Bombers
C – Bob Swift, Winnipeg Blue Bombers
OG – Ralph Galloway, Saskatchewan Roughriders
OG – Curtis Wester, BC Lions
OT – Charlie Turner, Edmonton Eskimos
OT – Larry Watkins, Edmonton Eskimos

Defence
DT – John Helton, Calgary Stampeders
DT – Garrett Hunsperger, BC Lions
DE – Jim Heighton, Winnipeg Blue Bombers
DE – George Wells, Saskatchewan Roughriders
LB – Ray Nettles, BC Lions
LB – Pete Wysocki, Saskatchewan Roughriders
LB – Roger Goree, Calgary Stampeders
DB – Paul Williams, Winnipeg Blue Bombers
DB – Chuck Willis, Winnipeg Blue Bombers
DB – Larry Highbaugh, Edmonton Eskimos
DB – Lorne Richardson, Saskatchewan Roughriders
DB – Ted Provost, Saskatchewan Roughriders
DB – Howard Starks, Calgary Stampeders

1974 CFL Awards
CFL's Most Outstanding Player Award – Tom Wilkinson (QB), Edmonton Eskimos
CFL's Most Outstanding Canadian Award – Tony Gabriel (TE), Hamilton Tiger-Cats
CFL's Most Outstanding Defensive Player Award – John Helton (DT), Calgary Stampeders
CFL's Most Outstanding Offensive Lineman Award – Ed George (OG), Montreal Alouettes
CFL's Most Outstanding Rookie Award – Sam Cvijanovich (LB), Toronto Argonauts
CFL's Coach of the Year – Marv Levy, Montreal Alouettes

References 

CFL
Canadian Football League seasons